First Criminal Brigade (French: Première brigade criminelle) is a 1962 French crime film directed by Maurice Boutel.

Cast
 Dora Doll as Julia Manton  
 Jacques Dumesnil as Commissar Masson  
 Jacqueline Joubert as Joelle  
 Véronique Silver 
 Carl Studer as Motincky  
 Howard Vernon as Steven Hals  
 Jean Vinci as Mario

References

Bibliography 
 Philippe Rège. Encyclopedia of French Film Directors, Volume 1. Scarecrow Press, 2009.

External links 
 

1962 films
1962 crime films
French crime films
1960s French-language films
Films directed by Maurice Boutel
1960s French films